James Eckford Lauder  (15 August 1811 in Edinburgh – 27 March 1869 in Edinburgh) was a notable mid-Victorian Scottish artist, famous for both portraits and historical pictures.

Life and work
A younger brother of artist Robert Scott Lauder, he was born at Silvermills, Edinburgh, the 5th and youngest son of John Lauder of Silvermills (proprietor of the great tannery there) by his spouse Helen née Tait. Under the guidance and encouragement of his elder brother Robert, an early love of art was rapidly developed.

James Eckford Lauder attended Edinburgh Academy from 1824 to 1828. In 1834 he joined Robert in Italy, and remained there nearly four years. Upon his return to Edinburgh he became an annual contributor to the Exhibitions of the Royal Scottish Academy, and exhibited occasionally at the Royal Academy in London, where his works attracted much attention.

In 1839 he was elected an associate, and in 1846 became full member, of the Royal Scottish Academy entitling him to the postnominals 'RSA' after his name.  In 1847 he sent to the competition in Westminster Hall The Parable of Forgiveness for which he was awarded a premium of two hundred pounds. One of his most successful works, The Wise and Foolish Virgins, was engraved by Lumb Stocks for the Association for the Promotion of the Fine Arts in Scotland.

He never married and died from "exhaustion", at 16 Salisbury Street, Edinburgh.

He is buried with his brother in Warriston Cemetery on the eastern edge of the westmost path, towards the south end of the original cemetery.

The following are said to be amongst his principal pictures:

Hagar
The Unjust Servant (see Parable of the Unjust Steward)
The Wise and Foolish Virgins
Scene from The Two Gentlemen of Verona (1841)
Cherries  (1842)
Hop-Scotch (1843)
Night and Day (1845)
Bailie Duncan McWheeble at Breakfast (1854)
James Watt and the Steam Engine (1855; National Gallery of Scotland, Edinburgh)
Self-portrait
Sir Walter Scott

References
 Bryan's Dictionary of Painters and Engravers, edited by George C.Williamson, London 1927, (5 volumes).
 The Edinburgh Academy Register, Edinburgh, 1914.
 Testaments of John Lauder of Silvermills & Helen Tait, in the National Archives of Scotland.

External links
 

People educated at Edinburgh Academy
19th-century Scottish painters
Scottish male painters
Scottish portrait painters
Artists from Edinburgh
1811 births
1869 deaths
Royal Scottish Academicians
19th-century Scottish male artists